Odisha FC is an Indian professional association football  club based in Bhubaneswar, Odisha that competes in the Indian Super League. The club was established on 16 July 2014, as Delhi Dynamos FC, before relocating to Odisha in 2019.

List of players
The list includes all the players registered under an Odisha FC contract. Some players might not have featured in a professional game for the club.

Notable foreign internationals

 Alessandro Del Piero
 Roberto Carlos
 Florent Malouda
 Kalu Uche
 John Arne Riise
 Cole Alexander

List of foreign players
The list includes all the players registered under an Odisha FC contract. Some players might not have featured in a professional game for the club.

References

Odisha FC
Odisha FC players
players
Odisha
Association football player non-biographical articles